George Pritchard (1 August 1796 – 6 May 1883) was a British Christian missionary and diplomat.

Pritchard was born in Birmingham and studied at the mission seminary at Gosport. In 1824 he travelled to the Society Islands to undertake work for the London Missionary Society. While there, he campaigned against rival French Catholic missionaries, leading the French to demand compensation and threaten to bombard Papeete. In 1837 he was appointed British consul at Tahiti, advising Queen Pōmare IV. The Islands were annexed by France in spite of his protests, in 1843. He was compelled to leave the islands in 1844 and returned to England. In 1845 he was appointed British consul at Samoa, resigning in 1856 and subsequently living in retirement in England.

In 1844 he published his memoir The Missionary's Reward: Or, the Success of the Gospel in the Pacific, with a second printing in the year of publication.

See also
Jarnac Convention

References

External links

Pritchard, George (1796-1883), missionary and diplomatist by Samuel Timmins rev. Jane Samson in Dictionary of National Biography

1796 births
1883 deaths
People from Birmingham, West Midlands
English Anglican missionaries
Protestant missionaries in French Polynesia
British diplomats
British expatriates in French Polynesia
British expatriates in Samoa